The Anthem of the Nenets Autonomous Okrug is the anthem of the Nenets Autonomous Okrug, a federal subject of Russia. It is one of the national symbols of the Nenets Autonomous Okrug along with its flag and coat of arms. It was written by Inga Arteyeva with music by Tatiana Artemyeva and it was officially adopted in 2008.

Lyrics

References

Russian anthems
Regional songs
Culture of Nenets Autonomous Okrug
Nenets
National anthem compositions in F major